Fitzroy High School is a school catering for Years 7 to 10, located in Falconer Street, Fitzroy, Melbourne, Australia. The school was first opened in 1915, but closed in 1992. After a long community campaign, it re-opened in 2004.

History
The Fitzroy Central School as it was first known, opened for the 1915 school year, admitting students from Grades 5 to 8. In 1957, it received its current name, and was allowed to take students up to Year 12. In 1988, it merged with Exhibition High School, but retained its original site.

Closure
After coming to power in 1992, then-Victorian Premier Jeff Kennett embarked on an array of budget cuts in an attempt to restore the state's flagging finances. As a result, the decision was made to close a significant number of schools across the state. Fitzroy High was one of the first to be earmarked for closure, and it shut down at the end of the 1992 school year.

After its closure, the local community feared that the site, which had been public land ever since 1871, would be sold for development. Community groups decided to occupy the site, in an attempt to prevent its sale, and in a widely publicised campaign, maintained a 24-hour vigil for fourteen months. People occupied the site in four-hour shifts, or slept overnight in the principal's office or administration wing.

Twelve years later, Fitzroy High reopens its doors
In 1993, the state government finally struck a deal with the local community, and the Kangan Batman TAFE was allowed to use the site. They operated a campus at the site until 1998, when budgetary requirements forced it to close. The following year, they handed the site back to the Education Department. Around the same time, Jeff Kennett lost power, and was replaced by Steve Bracks, who was more supportive of their cause.

The site lay dormant for two years, until then-Education Minister Mary Delahunty approved plans to re-open the school for Years 7 to 10 in 2001. The site was significantly renovated, involving the construction of a new science and technology wing, a library and a food technology division.

During 2002, the school was used as a central filming location for the children's series Short Cuts.

Re-opening
On 28 January 2004, the school re-opened, with 135 students in Years 7 and 8. It expanded to Years 9 and 10 in the 2005 school year, and plans were announced in December 2005 to begin classes for Years 11 and 12 in 2007 in conjunction with another Melbourne school, Collingwood College.

A building program, comprising a unique design to facilitate the school's learning philosophy, was completed in 2009 to increase accommodation for up to 600 students in years 7-12. The new building has now won a number of design awards including the Dulux Colour and the Australian Institute of Architecture Victorian Chapter annual award 2010 -Public Alterations and Additions. The school was also short listed in the 2010 Premier Design Awards in Victoria.

New campus 
Since the start of 2022, Fitzroy High School has opened a new campus that they are sharing with Collingwood College. Their original (and main) campus only hosts year 7-10 students.

Notable alumni

Filmmaker Nadia Tass
Invincibles Test Cricketer Neil Harvey
Architect/developer Nonda Katsalidis 
Cinematographer/director Vincent Monton 
Actor George Spartels 
Author Tom Petsinis 
Businessman Frank Rudolph]
Human rights activist and Director of the International Board on Books for Young people based in Basel, Switzerland, Kimete [Katie] Mitrovica-Basha

Polltician Lidia Thorpe (Years 7 and 9)

Teachers

Writer Helen Garner, former MP Caroline Hogg, former Lord Mayor of Melbourne John So, painter John Brack, and past director of the National Gallery of Australia James Mollison previously taught at the school.

References

External links
 Fitzroy High School
 Education Minister's media release
 The Age: report of opening

Educational institutions established in 1915
Public high schools in Melbourne
1915 establishments in Australia
Fitzroy, Victoria